Sherry Coben is creator of the 1980s situation comedy Kate & Allie and the webseries Little Women, Big Cars. She was also a writer for the soap opera Ryan's Hope.

Coben grew up in Cherry Hill, New Jersey, and attended Cherry Hill High School West.

References

External links

American women television producers
American soap opera writers
Living people
American women television writers
People from Cherry Hill, New Jersey
Year of birth missing (living people)
Women soap opera writers
Screenwriters from New Jersey
Cherry Hill High School West alumni
Television producers from New Jersey
21st-century American women